Laajawab Talent Show is a TV dance talent show for youth, based on Hindi film songs, that was broadcast on the Indian TV channel DD Metro in 2002–2003. It was produced and directed by Mehmood Nazir. and the title track was by Bappi Lahiri.

The series is hosted by Shad Khan, Mallika Malhotra and Simran Dhol.

This show has decorated by Sunil Jhalani the best National Talent Coordinator.

References

DD Metro original programming
2002 Indian television series debuts
2003 Indian television series endings
Indian dance television shows